Pradeep Singh Sihag (born 21 November 1986) is an Indian Professional boxer. As a professional he has won the IPBO, PABA, OPBF & WBC Asian Middleweight championship titles. Pradeep has a professional record of 18 wins, 4 losses and 1 draw. His amateur record stands at 120 wins with 3 losses.

Early life
Born in Sisai in the state of Haryana, Pradeep is son of a former National Middleweight wrestling Champion and brother to a former National Middleweight Amateur boxing Champion.

Amateur career
As an amateur, Pradeep won the silver medal in the 2003 All India BD Chandiyala Boxing Championship and again took silver in the 2004 YMCA International Boxing Championship.

Professional career
After evicted from commonwealth squad Pradeep made his pro boxing debut on 18 March 2005 at Australia. He early get and won his first title bout against Arama Tabuai for the vacant PABA Middleweight title. On 23 September 2010 Pradeep fought Sam Soliman for the IBF Pan Pacific middleweight title but didn't succeed. On 11 November 2011 Singh won the vacant WBC Asian Boxing Council Middleweight title by defeating Yong Zhang. He lost his next fight to Yao Yi Ma at Vodafone Arena, Fiji.

Professional boxing record

Titles in boxing

|-
!colspan="3" style="background:#C1D8FF;"|Regional titles
|-

|-
!colspan="3" style="background:#C1D8FF;"|Other titles
|-

|-
  

|-

References

External links

 

1986 births
Living people
Indian male boxers
Boxers from Haryana
Middleweight boxers